Mukh O Mukhosh was the first Bengali-language feature film to be made in East Pakistan (now Bangladesh). It was produced by Iqbal Films and directed by Abdul Jabbar Khan. The film was released in East Pakistan on 3 August 1956. It was released in Dhaka, Chittagong, Narayanganj, and Khulna. The film was a great success as viewers thronged to watch the first film to be made in the region. It earned a total of  during its initial run.

Background

Abdul Jabbar Khan started working on the film in 1953. At that time, the film industry in erstwhile East Pakistan was virtually non-existent, and local film theatres screened mostly Urdu films from Lahore, Hindi films from Mumbai, and Bengal films from Kolkata. To establish the film making infrastructures, a meeting was held in 1953 where F. Dossani, a West Pakistani film distributor, claimed the local climate was not suitable for film production. Khan challenged him and start making the film. He went to Kolkata and discussed with Moni Bose, a prominent scriptwriter, to select the story. Khan primarily planned to make the film from the literary works of Kazi Nazrul Islam or Jasimuddin. But Bose selected Dakaat (Robbers), a play, and later a novel, written by Khan on a true story of robbery published in newspapers. Bose himself wrote the first 3 scenes. Khan finished the rest and started working on the films. He had to manage all the things, even the film camera, as then there wasn't any in East Pakistan. He worked on the film for two years. In the absence of any local film production studios, the negatives of the film had to be taken to Lahore for development.

Cast
 Aminul Haque
 Inam Ahmed
 Ali Mansoor
 Zahrat Ara
 Abdul Jabbar Khan
 Kazi Khaliq
 Purnima Sengupta
 Piyari Begum
 Saifuddin Ahmed
 Golam Mostafa
 Abul Khair
 Sona Mia
 Bilkis Bari

Production
Playback singers for the two songs in the film were Abdul Alim and Mahbuba Rahman. However, the song by Abdul Alim is lost, as the film of that part of the film has deteriorated completely. Mahbuba sang the other song in the film - Moner Boney Dola Laage Hashlo Dokhin Hawa. All lyrics  written by M. A. Gafur (Sharathee). Samar Das directed the music of the film.

Q.M. Zaman served as the cameraman. Shyam Babu was the make-up artist.

References

External links 
 

1956 films
1956 drama films
Bengali-language Pakistani films
Bangladeshi drama films
1950s Bengali-language films
Bangladeshi black-and-white films